A Whole Lotta Shaky is an album by Welsh rock and roll singer Shakin' Stevens, released in November 1988 by Epic Records. It peaked at number 42 on the UK Albums Chart.

Release and content
The album features three songs recorded in 1981, "Mona Lisa" and "I'm Gonna Sit Right Down and Write Myself a Letter" from Shaky, and "Oh Julie" from Give Me Your Heart Tonight. Three singles were released from A Whole Lotta Shaky, although none of them reached the Top-20. For the single release of "Jezebel", the song was remixed and produced by the Art of Noise's J. J. Jeczalik. This remix is included on the bonus tracks of the 2009 release of the album as part of The Epic Masters box set. "What Do You Want to Make Those Eyes at Me For" appeared on Stevens' previous album Let's Boogie; however, this is the version that was released as a single.

The box set release also includes the non-album single "Feel the Need in Me", which had been released in July 1988, as well as the B-sides to the three album singles.

Track listing

2009 bonus tracks:

Personnel
Technical
 Denny Bridges – engineer (2–5, 8, 10–12)
 Rod Houison – engineer (7, 9, 14)
 Nick Froome – assistant engineer (7, 9, 14)
 Neill King – assistant engineer (7, 9, 14)
 Ted Hayton – engineer (13)
 Bob Heatlie – producer (2–5, 8, 10, 12), remixing (11)
 Shakin' Stevens – producer (1–6, 8, 10, 12), executive producer (13), remixing (13)
 Carey Taylor – producer (1, 6)
 Stuart Colman – producer (7, 9, 14)
 Christopher Neil – producer (11), additional production (5), remixing (5)
 Dave Edmunds – producer (13)
 Simon Cantwell – art direction
 The Artifex Studio – artwork
 Terry O'Neill – photography
 Track 1 recorded at Sarm Studios, London
 Track 6 recorded at Air Studios, London
 Track 13 recorded at Maison Rouge, London
 All other tracks recorded at Eden Studios, London

Charts

References

1988 albums
Shakin' Stevens albums
albums produced by Christopher Neil
albums produced by Dave Edmunds
Epic Records albums